Yasheel Aukhojee is a Mauritian doctor in medicine and head of Médecin à domicile ltd in Mauritius. He is known for his philanthropy work specially for the old age people in the island. Yasheel was born in a part of Mauritius where many ethnic groups are co-located. His brother Yashveer and sister Maneesha both pursued doctorate in medicine. He started Médecin à domicile, an organization to provide medical and health facilities to the people in their home and work. Aukhojee obtained his medical degree from Nizhniy Novgorod State Medical Academy. He has co-authored several articles in peer-reviewed journals and conferences.

He currently holds the position of chief executive officer (CEO) at Médecin à Domicile.

References

Living people
Year of birth missing (living people)
Place of birth missing (living people)
Mauritian physicians